Gustavo Adolfo Salinas Camiña (1893–1964) was a pioneer aviator. He was the first to use a plane to attack a ship at sea in the action of 9 April 1914. He is buried in the "Panteón Municipal San José" located in the city of Cuatro Ciénegas de Carranza, Coahuila, México.

References

Members of the Early Birds of Aviation
1893 births
1964 deaths